"It Won't Be Over You" is a song written by Trey Bruce and Thom McHugh, and recorded by American country music artist Steve Wariner.  It was released in April 1994 as the third single from the album Drive.  The song reached #18 on the Billboard Hot Country Singles & Tracks chart.

Chart performance

References

1994 singles
Steve Wariner songs
Songs written by Trey Bruce
Song recordings produced by Scott Hendricks
Arista Nashville singles
Songs written by Thom McHugh
1993 songs